Krasny Sad is a rural locality (a khutor) and the administrative center of Krasnoye Rural Settlement, Sredneakhtubinsky District, Volgograd Oblast, Russia. The population was 869 in 2010. There are 18 streets.

Geography 
Krasny Sad is located 12 km southeast of Srednyaya Akhtuba (the district's administrative centre) by road. Pervomaysky is the nearest rural locality.

References 

Rural localities in Sredneakhtubinsky District